Repeat Offender is the second studio album by singer/songwriter Richard Marx. Released in mid-1989, it reached No. 1 on the Billboard Pop Albums chart. The album was certified four times platinum in United States due to five major singles on the Billboard charts, including two No. 1 hits: "Satisfied" and the platinum-certified "Right Here Waiting".

History

After touring for fourteen months on his first album, Marx returned to the studio with a number of songs that had been written while on the road. The album was recorded with well-known L.A.-area studio musicians and would go on to become even more successful than his debut record, pushing Prince out of the No. 1 spot on Billboard 200 album chart.  Repeat Offender was the result of the energy generated from over a year and a half on the road and was written or co-written entirely by Marx.  "Some people might think that it would be easier this time around, that I could just kick back." Marx said at the time, "but the truth is, it’s harder, I’ve got more to prove."

The first two singles, "Satisfied" and the platinum-selling "Right Here Waiting," both reached No. 1, completing a string of three consecutive No. 1 singles.  When the third single from Repeat Offender, "Angelia" climbed to No. 4, Marx became the first solo artist to reach the Top 5 with his first seven singles. Since then, "Right Here Waiting" has been covered numerous times, most notably by Monica and 112 in a 1998 duet.

Another single from the album, "Children of the Night", was written in support of the suburban Los Angeles (Van Nuys)-based organization for runaways.  It became the sixth single from the album, and all royalties were donated to the charity.

Marx's second world tour began in the spring of 1989 and took him to Australia, Singapore, Malaysia,  Japan, Europe, Canada, and the United States, lasting through August 1990.  Highlights of that tour included a performance in the prestigious Royal Albert Hall in London and an invitation from Tina Turner to tour Germany.

Marx also had the once-in-a-lifetime opportunity to perform The Beatles' "Help!" at the Berlin Wall in late 1989.  Marx also received his second Grammy nomination in 1990 for "Best Pop Vocal Performance — Male" for "Right Here Waiting".

Track listing

Personnel 
 Richard Marx – lead vocals, backing vocals (1-4, 6-11)
 Michael Omartian – acoustic piano (1, 7, 11), keyboards (11)
 C.J. Vanston – keyboards (2-5, 8, 10, 11)
 Bill Champlin – Hammond B3 organ (1, 7–9), backing vocals (1, 7–9)
 Bill Payne – Hammond B3 organ (2)
 Bill Cuomo – keyboards (10)
 Steve Lukather – guitar (1), guitar solo (1)
 Bruce Gaitsch – guitar (2, 3, 5, 6, 8), guitar solo (6, 8), acoustic guitar (4)
 Michael Landau – guitar (2–4, 6, 7, 10, 11), guitar solo (2–4, 10, 11)
 Jon Walmsley – guitar (7, 9), 1st guitar solo (7)
 Paul Warren – 2nd guitar solo (7), guitar (9, 10)
 John Pierce – bass guitar (1)
 Randy Jackson – bass guitar (2, 6, 11), synth bass (8)
 Jim Cliff – bass guitar (3, 4, 7, 9, 10)
 Mike Baird – drums (1, 2)
 Prairie Prince – drums (3, 4, 6, 11)
 John Keane – drums (7, 10)
 John Robinson – drums (8)
 Michael DeRosier – drums (9)
 Paulinho da Costa – percussion (2, 8, 11)
 Marc Russo – saxophone (3, 11), sax solo (6)
 Dave Koz – saxophone (7)
 Tom Scott – sax solo (11)
 Larry Williams – saxophones (11)
 Gary Grant – trumpet (11)
 Jerry Hey – trumpet (11)
 Dick Marx – horn arrangements (11)
 Bobby Kimball – backing vocals (1, 7–9)
 Cynthia Rhodes – backing vocals (2, 6, 11)
 Fee Waybill – backing vocals (4)
 David Cole – backing vocals (6)
 Bob Coy – backing vocals (6)
 Tommy Funderburk – backing vocals (6)
 Ruth Marx – backing vocals (6)
 John Moore – backing vocals (6)
 Shelley Cole – backing vocals (11)
 Kevin Cronin – backing vocals (11)
 Larry Gatlin – backing vocals (11)
 Rudy Gatlin – backing vocals (11)
 Steve Gatlin – backing vocals (11)
 Gene Miller – backing vocals (11)
 Don Shelton – backing vocals (11)
 Terry Williams – backing vocals (11)
 The Children of the Night – choir on "Children of the Night"

Production
 All tracks arranged by Richard Marx, with assistance by Steve Lukather (track 1), Jeffrey Vanston (track 3) and Bruce Gaitsch (track 6).
 Produced by Richard Marx and David Cole
 Recorded by David Cole; assisted by Peter Doell.
 Mixed by David Cole
Assistant Engineers (recording and mix): Laura Livingston, Mark McKenna, Brian Scheuble, Bob Vogt, Charlie Paakkari, Leslie Ann Jones, Mike Bosley, Jay Lean, David Night, Tom Fouce.
 Mastered by Wally Traugott
 Production Coordination – Susanne Marie Edgren
 Art Direction – Henry Marquez
 Design – DZN - The Design Group
 Photography – E. J. Camp
 Management – Allen Kovac

Charts

Weekly charts

Year-end charts

Certifications

Miscellaneous
 The Japanese version of the album contained a bonus track, "Wild Life".
 The album was dedicated to Gabrielle de Martino.

References

1989 albums
Richard Marx albums
Albums produced by Richard Marx
Albums produced by David N. Cole
Capitol Records albums